Oscar Alberto Hidalgo Forcelledo (born 9 October 1982 in Puebla) is a Mexican auto racing driver. His father, also named Oscar, was a racing driver as well, and competed in the 1989 480km of Mexico, the final round of the 1989 World Sportscar Championship season.

Career
Hidalgo finished third in the 2004 Formula Renault 2000 de America series. He then finished runner-up in 2005. He finished 11th in the 2006 season. He competed at two rounds of the 2007 season. The series was cancelled during the 2008 season.

Hidalgo raced for the Wiechers-Sport team at his local round of the 2006 World Touring Car Championship season, the Race of Mexico. He finished the two races in 24th and 14th place.

References

External links

Living people
1982 births
Sportspeople from Puebla
Mexican racing drivers
Latin America Formula Renault 2000 drivers
World Touring Car Championship drivers